Jesús Cabrera Balsa (born 6 December 1945) is a Spanish former backstroke swimmer. He competed at the 1964 Summer Olympics and the 1968 Summer Olympics.

Notes

References

External links
 

1945 births
Living people
Spanish male backstroke swimmers
Olympic swimmers of Spain
Swimmers at the 1964 Summer Olympics
Swimmers at the 1968 Summer Olympics
Mediterranean Games medalists in swimming
Mediterranean Games silver medalists for Spain
Swimmers at the 1967 Mediterranean Games
Sportspeople from Las Palmas
Swimmers at the 1963 Mediterranean Games